No Future is a 2021 American drama film directed by Mark Smoot and Andrew Irvine and starring Catherine Keener, Charlie Heaton, Rosa Salazar, Jefferson White and Jackie Earle Haley.

Plot
Will is a recovering drug addict whose friend Chris died of a overdose after visiting him. Will, while struggling to keep his life together, begins to have an affair with Chris' mom, Claire.

Cast
Catherine Keener as Claire
Charlie Heaton as Will
Rosa Salazar as Becca
Jefferson White as Chris
Jackie Earle Haley as Philip
Austin Amelio as Preston
Heather Kafka as Linda
Jason Douglas as Doug
Kia Nicole Boyer as Erin
Mollie Milligan as Deborah
Jasmine Shanise as Woman in Nursery
Marissa Woolf

Release
The film premiered at the Tribeca Film Festival on June 13, 2021.

Reception
The film has a 91 percent rating on Rotten Tomatoes based on 23 reviews.

Sheri Linden of The Hollywood Reporter gave the film a positive review and wrote, "...through the unpredictability of its two leads, Keener especially, and in the knotty connection between their characters, the movie gets under the skin and goes beyond the bromide-laden playbook."

Peter Sobczynski of RogerEbert.com awarded the film three stars and wrote, "...a fairly smart and realistic depiction of two people consumed by grief, guilt, and loss and the misguided ways by which they attempt to come to terms with those feelings."

Andrew Stover of Film Threat rated the film an 8 out of 10 and wrote, "Smoot and Irvine appreciate an exceedingly solemn tone and a measured pace. No Future is unassuming, truthful, and absorbing by virtue of the deeply sensitive performances..."

References

External links
 
 

2021 drama films
2020s English-language films